Tarucus grammicus, the dark Pierrot or black Pierrot, is a butterfly in the family Lycaenidae. It is found in Yemen, southern Ethiopia, Somalia, eastern and northern Kenya and northern Tanzania. The habitat consists of savanna.

The larvae feed on Ziziphus abysinnica.

References

Butterflies described in 1893
Tarucus
Butterflies of Africa